Gepo is a town in Fuchuan Yao Autonomous County, Guangxi, China.

Administrative division
As of 2016, the town is divided into one community and twelve villages: 

 Gepojie Community
 Lingui
 Zhaixiang
 Jile
 Shantang
 Banzhu
 Qishan
 Shenpo
 Maping
 Shangdong
 Hedong
 Macao
 Lou

History
In 1984 it separated from Mailing Township (now Mailing). In 1996 it was upgraded to a town.

Geography
The town lies at the northern of Fuchuan Yao Autonomous County, bordering Chengbei Town to the west, Fuyang Town and Fuli Town to the south, Mailing Town to the north, and Shijia Township to the east.

The Fuchuan River flows through the town north to south.

Economy
The principal industries in the area are agriculture, forestry and mineral resources. Agricultural crops include grains, vegetables, fruits, tobacco, navel orange, pear, and Ziziphus mauritiana. The region also has an abundance of iron, tin, copper, manganese and granite.

Transportation
The town is connected to two highways: the China National Highway G538 and the S13 Zhongshan County–Fuchuan County Expressway.

References

Bibliography

Towns of Hezhou